Albayrak Balıkesir cogeneration power station is a small coal-fired power station in Turkey in Balıkesir Province. The power station is cogeneration in that it generates both electricity and steam for SEKA Balıkesir paper factory.

References

External links 

 Albayrak Varaka Paper power station on Global Energy Monitor

Coal-fired power stations in Turkey